New Jersey Transit operates the following bus routes across Camden, Gloucester, and Salem counties, with most running to Philadelphia via the Benjamin Franklin Bridge. At the time that the routes were numbered as such all of these routes crossed the Delaware River via the Benjamin Franklin Bridge; the 403, 405, 407, 413, and 419 have since been cut back to Camden.  (The 418 was created as a separate designation of the 409.) All routes into Philadelphia operate via 6th, Market, Broad, and Vine Streets in Center City Philadelphia.

Effective Monday, September 19, 2011, bus routes 400 and 403 are now operating as "Exact Fare".

Routes
All service shown is for the full route except for branching. WRTC stands for Walter Rand Transportation Center in the table below.

Former routes
This list includes routes that have been renumbered or are now operated by private companies.

External links
New Jersey Transit - Bus
Chicago Transit & Railfan Web Site: New Jersey Transit
Unofficial New Jersey Transit bus map

 400
Lists of New Jersey bus routes